Kyzyl-Bel is a village in Batken Region of Kyrgyzstan. It is part of the Batken District. Its population was 7,481 in 2021.

Population

References

Populated places in Batken Region